The Lepcha script, or Róng script, is an abugida used by the Lepcha people to write the Lepcha language. Unusually for an abugida, syllable-final consonants are written as diacritics.

History

Lepcha is derived from the Tibetan script, and may have some Burmese influence. According to tradition, it was devised at the beginning of the 18th century by prince Chakdor Namgyal of the Namgyal dynasty of Sikkim, or by scholar Thikúng Men Salóng in the 17th century. Early Lepcha manuscripts were written vertically. When they were later written horizontally, the letters remained in their new orientations, rotated 90° from their Tibetan prototypes. This resulted in an unusual method of writing final consonants.

Typology

Lepcha is now written horizontally, but the changes in the direction of writing have resulted in a metamorphosis of the eight syllable-final consonants from conjuncts (ligatures) as in Tibetan to superposed diacritics.

As in most other Brahmic scripts, the short vowel /-a/ is not written; other vowels are written with diacritics before (/-i, -o/), after (/-ā, -u/), or under (/-e/) the initial consonant. The length mark, however, is written over the initial, as well as any final consonant diacritic, and fuses with /-o/ and /-u/. (When fused as /-ō/, however, it lies below any final consonant.) Initial vowels do not have separate letters, but are written with the vowel diacritics on an &-shaped zero-consonant letter.

There are postposed diacritics for medial /-y-/ and /-r-/, which may be combined (krya). For medial /-l-/, however, there are seven dedicated conjunct letters. That is, there is a special letter for /kla/ which does not resemble the letter for /ka/. (Only /gla/ is written with a straightforward diacritic.)

One of the final letters, /-ŋ/, is an exception to these patterns. First, unlike the other finals, final /-ŋ/ is written to the left of the initial consonant rather than on top, occurring even before preposed vowels. That is, /kiŋ/ is written "ngki". Second, there is no inherent vowel before /-ŋ/; even short /-a-/ must be written, with a diacritic unique to this situation. (It appears to be the diacritic for long /-ā/ rotated 180° around the consonant letter.) That is, /kaŋ/ is written "ngka", rather than "" as would be expected from the general pattern.

Structure
As an abugida, a basic letter represents both a consonant and an inherent vowel.

Consonants

Vowels

Numerals

Unicode

Lepcha script was added to the Unicode Standard in April, 2008 with the release of version 5.1.

The Unicode block for Lepcha is U+1C00–U+1C4F:

References
Leonard van der Kuijp, The Tibetan Script and Derivatives, in Daniels and Bright, The World's Writing Systems, 1996.

External links

 Lepcha script at Omniglot.com
 Róng Kít - A free Lepcha Unicode Kit including fonts and keyboard files (Win/Mac/Linux), published by the Sikkim Bhutia Lepcha Apex Committee (SIBLAC)
 Noto Sans Lepcha - A free Lepcha Unicode font that harmonizes with other fonts of the Noto font family
 Mingzat - A Lepcha Unicode font by SIL, based on Jason Glavy’s JG Lepcha
 JG Lepcha - A free and well designed but non-Unicode compliant font by Jason Glavy.

Brahmic scripts